Hope for Haiti Now: A Global Benefit for Earthquake Relief was a charity telethon held on January 22, 2010 from 8 p.m. to 10 p.m. Eastern Standard Time (January 23, 2010 from 1 a.m. to 3 a.m. UTC). The telethon was the most widely distributed telethon in history. The event was broadcast from Studio 36 at CBS Television City in Los Angeles, Kaufman Astoria Studios in Queens, New York and a private club, The Hospital, in London. There were also live reports from Haiti.

Initial plans for the telethon were announced by MTV Networks on January 15, 2010, three days after the 2010 Haiti earthquake struck on January 12 that is assumed to have claimed the lives of about 200,000 people. The event was one of a number of humanitarian responses to the earthquake. Processing of the telethon's donations was in the hands of the Entertainment Industry Foundation. The telethon was patterned after the form begun with the 2001 America: A Tribute to Heroes program and continued with the 2005 Shelter from the Storm: A Concert for the Gulf Coast.

Funds raised by the telethon and from the sale of an accompanying album and video, which was immediately made available for pre-order on iTunes, were distributed to seven non-profit organizations doing relief work in Haiti.

Recipients
Funds were distributed to the following organizations with humanitarian operations in Haiti:
 The Clinton Bush Haiti Fund
 United Nations World Food Programme
 Oxfam America
 Partners In Health
 Red Cross
 UNICEF
 Yéle Haiti Foundation

In 2012 The New York Times reported that a forensic audit conducted by the New York Attorney General's office found that much of the money distributed to the Yéle Haiti organization from the telethon was retained by founder Wyclef Jean and his associates for their own benefit.

Audience and proceeds raised
The event drew an estimated audience of 83 million viewers in the United States between the initial broadcast and web and mobile streams throughout the weekend.

On January 23, it was reported that the telethon had raised over 58 million, not including corporate and large private donors or sales of the album and video. The amount is a record for donations by the general public to a telethon for disaster-relief. On January 25 the figure was revised to $61 million.

Viewers were encouraged to donate online, calling toll-free (1-877-99-HAITI), by texting or by mail. Donations were accepted up to six months after the broadcast.

Participants
Wyclef Jean hosted the concert in New York City, with George Clooney in Los Angeles and Anderson Cooper in Haiti.

Rihanna revealed on January 21 that she would perform a new song titled "Stranded (Haiti Mon Amour)", together with Jay-Z and U2's The Edge and Bono for the telethon in London.

In San Francisco, Clint Eastwood and Matt Damon appealed for donations.

Appearance order
The telethon began and ended with images of victims in Haiti. Presented in a format similar to 2001's America: A Tribute to Heroes, the intervening two hours consisted of musical performances with speeches, reports from Haiti, and conversations between celebrity operators and donors calling in.

Times in the table are given from the beginning of the show (8 p.m. U.S. ET/1 a.m. UTC) and are based on the CBS airing in the US.
Descriptions are mostly from the MTV blog.

Locations of performers announced by USA Today:
 New York City: Wyclef Jean, Madonna, Bruce Springsteen, Jennifer Hudson, Mary J. Blige, Shakira, and Sting
 Los Angeles: Alicia Keys, Christina Aguilera, Dave Matthews, Neil Young, John Legend, Justin Timberlake, Stevie Wonder, Taylor Swift, Emeline Michel, and a group performance by Keith Urban, Kid Rock, and Sheryl Crow
 London: Beyoncé, Coldplay, Bono, The Edge, Jay-Z, and Rihanna. Performances by Bono, The Edge, Jay-Z, and Rihanna were pre-recorded earlier in the day.

Celebrity phone operators
Celebrity phone bank operators in alphabetical order (by surname):

 Ben Affleck
 Tim Allen
 Jennifer Aniston
 David Archuleta
 Alec Baldwin
 Ellen Barkin
 Drew Barrymore
 Garcelle Beauvais
 Jack Black
 Emily Blunt
 Russell Brand
 Benjamin Bratt
 Pierce Brosnan
 Gerard Butler
 Chevy Chase
 Kristin Chenoweth
 Sacha Baron Cohen
 Sean Combs
 Common
 Bradley Cooper
 Cat Cora
 Miranda Cosgrove
 Daniel Craig
 Cindy Crawford
 Penélope Cruz
 Billy Crystal
 John Cusack
 Miley Cyrus
 Daniel Day-Lewis
 Eric Dane
 Robert De Niro
 Ellen DeGeneres
 Leonardo DiCaprio
 Snoop Dogg
 Robert Downey Jr.
 Fran Drescher
 Michael Clarke Duncan
 Zac Efron
 Jenna Elfman
 Anna Faris
 Colin Farrell
 Andy García
 Mel Gibson
 Tyrese Gibson
 Selena Gomez
 Regina Hall
 Tom Hanks
 Neil Patrick Harris
 Taraji P. Henson
 Djimon Hounsou
 Terrence Howard
 Vanessa Hudgens
 Randy Jackson
 Jimmy Jean-Louis
 Elton John
 Dwayne Johnson
 Joe Jonas
 Kevin Jonas
 Nick Jonas
 Quincy Jones
 Victoria Justice
 Diane Keaton
 Michael Keaton
 Anna Kendrick
 Greg Kinnear
 Jane Krakowski
 John Krasinski
 Jessica Lange
 Queen Latifah
 Taylor Lautner
 Jared Leto
 Justin Long
 Jennifer Lopez
 Demi Lovato
 Tobey Maguire
 Ricky Martin
 Rose McGowan
 Ewan McGregor
 Katharine McPhee
 Debra Messing
 Alyssa Milano
 Shemar Moore
 Jack Nicholson
 Keke Palmer
 Holly Robinson Peete
 Katy Perry
 Tyler Perry
 Chris Pine
 Jeremy Piven
 Jeremy Renner
 Tim Robbins
 Emma Roberts
 Julia Roberts
 Ray Romano
 Jeri Ryan
 Meg Ryan
 Zoe Saldana
 Adam Sandler
 Nicole Scherzinger
 Gabourey Sidibe
 Kimora Lee Simmons
 Russell Simmons
 Jessica Simpson
 Molly Sims
 Christian Slater
 Steven Spielberg
 Ringo Starr
 Taylor Swift
 Raven-Symone
 Charlize Theron
 Justin Timberlake
 Ashley Tisdale
 Marisa Tomei
 Amber Valletta
 Sofia Vergara
 Mark Wahlberg
 Joe Walsh
 Sigourney Weaver
 Forest Whitaker
 Olivia Wilde
 Robin Williams
 Rainn Wilson
 Reese Witherspoon
 Stevie Wonder
 Noah Wyle

Coverage
 Online Internationally: live on YouTube, MSN.com, Comedycentral.com, CNN.com Live, Bebo and the CNN iPhone app. The program was also streamed on delay on Sacramento Fox affiliate KTXL's website, FOX40.com, during the Pacific Time Zone airing of the telethon.
 Online Domestic (USA): live on Hulu
 Latin America: The show aired live on CNN en Español, CNN International, MTV Latin America, VH1 Latin America, National Geographic Channel, MuchMusic, Warner Channel, People and Arts, Discovery Home and Health, E!, Animax, Cartoon Network and Boomerang. CNN en Español. C5N aired the program with voiceovers translating reports, phone conversations and introductions to the musical presentations in Spanish.
 Australia (times AEDT): live at noon on MTV Australia, VH1 Australia, CNN, and Network Ten; and repeated at 8:30 p.m. on National Geographic Channel, 9 p.m. on E! and 10 p.m. on Style Network.
 Austria: The show aired live on ORF 1, MTV Austria and VIVA Austria.
 Belgium: The show was broadcast live at 2:00 CET on CNN International, National Geographic Channel, MTV, TMF.
 Brazil: The show aired live on MTV Brasil, National Geographic Channel, People+Arts, E!, Discovery Home&Health, CNN International and Warner Channel. Also, Cartoon Network and sister channels borrowed the signal from MTV Brasil.
 Bulgaria: The show was broadcast at 8:40 CET on BNT 1.
 Canada: The show aired on CTV, CBC Television, Global, Citytv, MuchMusic, CP24 and MTV Canada, simulcasting with the American airing. Depending on time zone, this was preceded or followed by Canada for Haiti. The show was also streamed live via CTV.ca, GlobalTv.com, Citytv.com and CP24.com.
 Czech Republic: The show was broadcast at 2:00 p.m. CET on ČT24, January 23.
 Croatia: The show aired on Croatian Radiotelevision and MTV Adria
 Denmark: The show aired on TV2 Denmark, National Geographic Channel CNN and MTV between 2:00 and 4:00 a.m. and on TV3 the 23rd between 8:00 and 10:00 p.m. local time 
 Finland: The show aired on YLE Teema.
 France: The show aired on BFM TV and MTV France.
 Germany: The show aired live on MTV Germany, VIVA Germany, TNT Serie and National Geographic Channel.
 Greece: The show aired live on MTV Greece.
 Hong Kong: The show aired live (9:00 a.m.) and repeated at 9:00 p.m. on MTV Asia and at 8:00 p.m. on TVB Pearl with Chinese subtitles. (All in local time on January 23, 2010)
 Hungary: The show aired on MTV Hungary, Viva Hungary and National Geographic Channel.
 India: The show aired on VH1 India.
 Indonesia: The show aired on Global TV (Indonesia).
 Ireland: The show aired live (1:00 to 3:00 WET) on TV3 and on MTV UK & Ireland and VH1 UK, Viva, CNN International, BET, National Geographic, Style Network and E!
 Israel: The show aired at 3 a.m. on Channel 10, as well as MTV, National Geographic Channel, VH1 and CNN International.
 Italy: The show aired at 2 a.m. on MTV Italia.
 Macedonia: The show aired on several broadcasters, including MRTV, A1, Kanal 5, Alfa TV.
 Netherlands: The show was broadcast live at 2:00 CET on Nederland 3, CNN International, National Geographic Channel Nederland, MTV NL, TMF Nederland, VH1 Europe and VH1 Classic Europe.
 Norway: The show aired live on TVNorge and National Geographic Channel. It will also be repeated on NRK3 at 9:30 p.m. CET on January 23.
 Poland: The show aired live on MTV Poland, VH1 Poland, National Geographic Polska and VIVA Polska.
 Portugal: The show aired live on MTV Portugal at 1:00 a.m. local time on January 23.
 Romania: The show aired live on Antena 3, at local time 3 a.m.
 Russia: The show aired live on MTV Russia.
 Serbia:The show aired live on B92 Info.
 Slovakia: The show repeated on TV Doma at 10:30 a.m. on January 23.
 Slovenia: The show aired live on TV Slo 1 and TV3.
 Sweden: The show aired live on MTV Sweden, TV4 and Kanal 5. It was repeated on SVT1, TV3, and MTV the following day.
 Turkey: The show aired live on MTV Turkey, TNT, National Geographic Channel, CNN Türk.
 Ukraine: The show aired live on MTV Ukraine.
 United Kingdom: The show was broadcast live at 1 a.m. GMT on all MTV UK & Ireland and VH1 UK, Viva, CNN International, BET, National Geographic Channel (UK), Style Network and E!. News channels were allowed to opt in to show coverage. The show was repeated on January 24 at 9 a.m. UTC on MTV and Viva.
 United States: The program aired live at 8 p.m. ET and tape-delayed in the PT at 8 p.m. on the MTV group of channels (including MTV, VH1, and CMT), as well as on ABC, CBS, Fox, NBC, PBS, The CW, BET, CNN, CNN International, MSNBC, TNT, Comedy Central, Bravo (US), Oxygen, E!, Style Network, G4, Fuse TV, ReelzChannel, MLB Network, Current TV, Discovery Health, HBO and Showtime (main channels only), National Geographic Channel, Soapnet, Centric, Smithsonian Channel, Planet Green, and The Weather Channel. On channels that had only one national feed, such as CNN, the program was televised live coast-co-coast on these channels, at 8 p.m. ET / 5 p.m. PT. The program was also streamed on delay by FOX40.com.
 Uruguay: The program aired live on Monte Carlo TV
 South East Asia: The program was aired live on MTV Asia and CNN International at 8 a.m. (UTC+8).

Discography
The digital album Hope for Haiti Now set a record as the largest one-day album pre-order in iTunes history, and became the top-selling iTunes album in 18 countries. The digital album has since become available at Amazon.com and Rhapsody. The album features 19 live performances from the broadcast as well as a pre-recorded version of "Stranded (Haiti Mon Amour)" and is priced at $7.99. The full two-hour video of the event is priced at $2.99.

Album

Singles

See also
Chile helps Chile
Canada for Haiti
Ensemble pour Haïti
Everybody Hurts#Helping Haiti charity single
We Are the World: 25 for Haiti
Humanitarian response by non-governmental organizations to the 2010 Haiti earthquake

References

External links
Youtube video

Benefit concerts
Music television specials
American telethons
2010 Haiti earthquake relief
2010 in British music
2010 television specials
2010 in the United States
Simulcasts